The Turners of Prospect Road  is a 1947 British drama film directed by Maurice J. Wilson and starring Wilfrid Lawson, Helena Pickard and Maureen Glynne. A pet greyhound wins a major race meeting. It was shot at Walton Studios. As of 1996, it was missing from the National Film Archive. It was shown on Talking Pictures TV on 16 May 2021.

Premise
A London cabby finds a greyhound puppy in his cab, and gives it to his daughter. She raises it and trains it up at the race tracks, and in spite of crooked rival owners, the dog eventually wins the Greyhound Derby.

Cast
 Wilfrid Lawson as Will Turner 
 Helena Pickard as Lil Turner 
 Maureen Glynne as Betty Turner 
 Amy Veness as Grandma 
 Jeanne de Casalis as Mrs. Webster 
 Shamus Locke as Terence O'Keefe 
 Desmond Tester as Nicky 
 Christopher Steele as Magistrate 
 Giselle Morlais as Jacqueline 
 Joy Frankau as Ruby 
 Andrew Blackett as Andrew Carroll 
 Gus McNaughton as Knocker 
 Charles Farrell as Jack 
 Peter Bull as J.G. Clarkson

Critical reception
TV Guide noted, "there are some fine moments of humor in this simple film and the acting is good, though not extraordinary. Made on an obviously limited budget, this is a good example of generic filmmaking, its amiable and predictable story populated by cutout characters."

The film was criticised by sectors of the greyhound industry for stereotypical portrayal of greyhound racing. The filming took place at Clapton Stadium and White City Stadium.

Bibliography
 Gillett, Philip John. The British working class in postwar film. Manchester University Press, 2003.

References

External links

1947 films
1947 drama films
Films directed by Maurice J. Wilson
Lost British films
Films set in London
Films shot in London
Films shot at Nettlefold Studios
1940s sports drama films
British sports drama films
Films and television featuring Greyhound racing
1940s lost films
Lost drama films
British black-and-white films
Films with screenplays by Patrick Kirwan
Greyhound racing films
1940s English-language films
1940s British films